Warszawa Żwirki i Wigury railway station is a railway station in the Ochota district of Warsaw, Poland. It is served by Koleje Mazowieckie, who run services from Warszawa Wschodnia to Góra Kalwaria or Skarżysko-Kamienna.

References
Station article at kolej.one.pl

External links

Railway stations in Poland opened in 2008
Zwirki i Wigury
Railway stations served by Koleje Mazowieckie
Ochota